A nursery rhyme is a traditional poem or song for children in Britain and many other countries, but usage of the term dates only from the late 18th/early 19th century. The term Mother Goose rhymes is interchangeable with nursery rhymes.

From the mid-16th century nursery rhymes begin to be recorded in English plays, and most popular rhymes date from the 17th and 18th centuries. The first English collections, Tommy Thumb's Song Book and a sequel, Tommy Thumb's Pretty Song Book, were published by Mary Cooper in 1744. Publisher John Newbery's stepson, Thomas Carnan, was the first to use the term Mother Goose for nursery rhymes when he published a compilation of English rhymes, Mother Goose's Melody, or, Sonnets for the Cradle (London, 1780).

History

Lullabies

The oldest children's songs of which we have records are lullabies, intended to help a child fall asleep. Lullabies can be found in every human culture. The English term lullaby is thought to come from "lu, lu" or "la la" sounds made by mothers or nurses to calm children, and "" or "bye bye", either another lulling sound or a term for good night. Until the modern era lullabies were usually recorded only incidentally in written sources. The Roman nurses' lullaby, "Lalla, Lalla, Lalla, aut dormi, aut lacta", is recorded in a scholium on Persius and may be the oldest to survive.

Many medieval English verses associated with the birth of Jesus take the form of a lullaby, including "Lullay, my liking, my dere son, my sweting" and may be versions of contemporary lullabies. However, most of those used today date from the 17th century. For example, a well known lullaby such as "Rock-a-bye, baby on a tree top", cannot be found in records until the late-18th century when it was printed by John Newbery (c. 1765).

Early nursery rhymes

A French poem, similar to "Thirty days hath September", numbering the days of the month, was recorded in the 13th century. From the later Middle Ages there are records of short children's rhyming songs, often as marginalia. From the mid-16th century they begin to be recorded in English plays. "Pat-a-cake, pat-a-cake, baker's man" is one of the oldest surviving English nursery rhymes. The earliest recorded version of the rhyme appears in Thomas d'Urfey's play The Campaigners from 1698. Most nursery rhymes were not written down until the 18th century, when the publishing of children's books began to move from polemic and education towards entertainment, but there is evidence for many rhymes existing before this, including "To market, to market" and "Cock a doodle doo", which date from at least the late 16th century. Nursery rhymes with 17th century origins include, "Jack Sprat" (1639), "The Grand Old Duke of York" (1642), "Lavender's Blue" (1672) and "Rain Rain Go Away" (1687).

The first English collections, Tommy Thumb's Song Book and a sequel, Tommy Thumb's Pretty Song Book, were published by Mary Cooper in London in 1744, with such songs becoming known as 'Tommy Thumb's songs'. A copy of the latter is held in the British Library. John Newbery's stepson, Thomas Carnan, was the first to use the term Mother Goose for nursery rhymes when he published a compilation of English rhymes, Mother Goose's Melody, or, Sonnets for the Cradle (London, 1780). These rhymes seem to have come from a variety of sources, including traditional riddles, proverbs, ballads, lines of Mummers' plays, drinking songs, historical events, and, it has been suggested, ancient pagan rituals. One example of a nursery rhyme in the form a riddle is "As I was going to St Ives", which dates to 1730. About half of the currently recognised "traditional" English rhymes were known by the mid-18th century. More English rhymes were collected by Joseph Ritson in Gammer Gurton's Garland or The Nursery Parnassus (1784), published in London by Joseph Johnson.

19th century

In the early 19th century printed collections of rhymes began to spread to other countries, including Robert Chambers's Popular Rhymes of Scotland (1826) and in the United States, Mother Goose's Melodies (1833). From this period we sometimes know the origins and authors of rhymes—for instance, in "Twinkle Twinkle Little Star" which combines the melody of an 18th-century French tune "Ah vous dirai-je, Maman" with a 19th-century English poem by Jane Taylor entitled "The Star" used as lyrics.

Early folk song collectors also often collected (what are now known as) nursery rhymes, including in Scotland Sir Walter Scott and in Germany Clemens Brentano and Achim von Arnim in Des Knaben Wunderhorn (1806–1808). The first, and possibly the most important academic collection to focus in this area was James Orchard Halliwell's The Nursery Rhymes of England (1842) and Popular Rhymes and Tales in 1849, in which he divided rhymes into antiquities (historical), fireside stories, game-rhymes, alphabet-rhymes, riddles, nature-rhymes, places and families, proverbs, superstitions, customs, and nursery songs (lullabies). By the time of Sabine Baring-Gould's A Book of Nursery Songs (1895), folklore was an academic study, full of comments and footnotes. A professional anthropologist, Andrew Lang (1844–1912) produced The Nursery Rhyme Book in 1897.

20th century
The early years of the 20th century are notable for the illustrations to children's books including Randolph Caldecott's Hey Diddle Diddle Picture Book (1909) and Arthur Rackham's Mother Goose (1913). The definitive study of English rhymes remains the work of Iona and Peter Opie.

Meanings of nursery rhymes
Many nursery rhymes have been argued to have hidden meanings and origins. John Bellenden Ker (1765–1842), for example, wrote four volumes arguing that English nursery rhymes were actually written in 'Low Saxon', a hypothetical early form of Dutch. He then 'translated' them back into English, revealing in particular a strong tendency to anti-clericalism. Many of the ideas about the links between rhymes and historical persons, or events, can be traced back to Katherine Elwes's book The Real Personages of Mother Goose (1930), in which she linked famous nursery-rhyme characters with real people, on little or no evidence. She posited that children's songs were a peculiar form of coded historical narrative, propaganda or covert protest, and did not believe that they were written simply for entertainment.

Nursery rhyme revisionism

There have been several attempts, across the world, to revise nursery rhymes (along with fairy tales and popular songs). As recently as the late 18th century, rhymes like "Little Robin Redbreast" were occasionally cleaned up for a young audience. In the late 19th century the major concern seems to have been violence and crime, which led some children's publishers in the United States like Jacob Abbot and Samuel Goodrich to change Mother Goose rhymes.

In the early and mid-20th centuries this was a form of bowdlerisation, concerned with some of the more violent elements of nursery rhymes and led to the formation of organisations like the British 'Society for Nursery Rhyme Reform'. Psychoanalysts such as Bruno Bettelheim strongly criticized this revisionism, on the grounds that it weakened their usefulness to both children and adults as ways of symbolically resolving issues and it has been argued that revised versions may not perform the functions of catharsis for children, or allow them to imaginatively deal with violence and danger.

In the late 20th century revisionism of nursery rhymes became associated with the idea of political correctness. Most attempts to reform nursery rhymes on this basis appear to be either very small scale, light-hearted updating, like Felix Dennis's When Jack Sued Jill – Nursery Rhymes for Modern Times (2006), or satires written as if from the point of view of political correctness in order to condemn reform. The controversy in Britain in 1986 over changing the language of "Baa, Baa, Black Sheep" because, it was alleged in the popular press, it was seen as racially dubious, was apparently based only on a rewriting of the rhyme in one private nursery, as an exercise for the children.

Nursery rhymes and education
It has been argued that nursery rhymes set to music aid in a child's development. In the German Kniereitvers, the child is put in mock peril, but the experience is a pleasurable one of care and support, which over time the child comes to command for itself. Research also supports the assertion that music and rhyme increase a child's ability in spatial reasoning, which aid mathematics skills.

See also

 Children's song
 Counting-out game
 Fingerplay
 Folklore
 Kidsongs
 Limerick (poetry)
 List of nursery rhymes
 Oral tradition
 Wee Sing

Notes

Citations

Sources

External links

Children's poetry
Children's songs
 
Early childhood education in the United Kingdom